During the opening ceremony of the 1928 Summer Olympics, athletes from each country participating in the Olympics paraded into the arena. As Olympic tradition dictates, most participating nations paraded in the alphabetical order of the language of the host country (here Dutch), except Greece, who enters first at the founding nation of the Olympics, and the host country (here the Netherlands) who enters last.

During the Parade of Nations, athletes from all participating countries entered the Olympisch Stadion. Each team was led by a flag bearer that was one of their athletes or officials, designated either by their respective National Olympic Committee (NOC) or by the athletes themselves.

List
Below is a list of parading countries and their announced flag bearer, in the same order as the parade. This is sortable by country name, flag bearer's name, or flag bearer's sport. Names are given in the form officially designated by the IOC (International Olympic Committee).

See also 
 1928 Summer Olympics.

References

1928 Summer Olympics
Lists of Olympic flag bearers